Soyot-Tsaatan (or Soyot) is an extinct and revitalizing Turkic language of the Siberian Sayan branch similar to the Dukhan language and closely related to the Tofa language. Two dialects/languages are spoken in Russia and Mongolia: Soyot in the Okinsky District of the Republic of Buryatia (Russia) and Tsaatan (Uriankhai Uyghur) in the Darkhad valley of Mongolia.

The language is revitalizing in primary schools. In 2002, V. I. Rassadin published a Soyot-Buryat-Russian dictionary. In 2020, he published a children's book in the Soyot language, along with Russian, Mongolian, and English translations.

Classification
Soyot-Tsaatan belongs to the Turkic family of languages. Within this family, it is placed in the Sayan Turkic branch. According to some researchers, the Sayan Turkic branch has five languages:

 Tuvan (ISO 639:tyv)
 Tofa (ISO 639:kim)
 Soyot
 Dukhan (ISO 639:dkh, rejected)
 Tuba (extinct, not to be confused with the Tubalar dialect of Northern Altai language)

According to Glottolog, the Soyot is a dialect of the Taiga and Sayan languages:

 Tuvinian language (ISO 639:tyv)
 Four dialects
 Taiga Sayan (ISO 639:kim)
 Dukha
 Soyot
 Toju
 Tofa
 Tuha
Ragagnin similarly divides the Sayan languages into two branches: Steppe and Taiga, but makes certain distinctions not made by Glottlog:

 Taiga
 Dukha
 Tofa
 Toju
 Tuvan dialects of Tere-Khöl
 Soyot
 Steppe
 Standard Tuvan
 Altay-Sayan varieties of China and Mongolia
 Tuha

Geographic distribution 
Soyot-Tsaatan has no official recognition in any of the countries where it is spoken. Until 1993, they were counted as part of the Buryat nationality in Russia. At this point, they were acknowledged as a separate nationality by the People's Khural of the Republic of Buryatia. After applying to the Russian Duma for official recognition, they were acknowledged as an ethnic minority in 2001. Most Soyots in Russia live in Buryatia's Okinsky District.

Phonology 
Rassadin reports that the two dialects, Soyot and Tsaatan, have very similar phonological systems. Information here is from Soyot.

Consonants

Vowels 

Vowels may be short, long, or short pharyngealized, e.g. /ɯt/ "send", /ɯˁt/ "dog", /ɯːt/ "sound, voice".

Soyot-Tsaatan exhibits vowel harmony, that is, words containing front vowels take only suffixes containing front vowels, whereas words with back vowels take only suffixes with back vowels.

Writing system 
Soyot-Tsaatan is not commonly written. Rassadin employs a Cyrillic-based writing system to represent Soyot in his dictionaries and grammars. Certain letters are only found in Russian loanwords.

Grammar

Nouns 
Nouns have singular and plural forms. The plural is formed with the suffix /-LAr/, which has six possible surface variations depending on vowel harmony and the preceding sound.

Possession is indicated by adding a suffix to the possessed noun, e.g.  ava-m "my mother", ava-ŋ "your mother". The possessive suffixes vary based on vowel harmony and whether the word they are attached to ends in a vowel or a consonant:

Case is indicated by adding suffixes after the plural and possessive markers, if they are present. There are seven cases in Soyot-Tsaatan. The nominative case is not marked. The six cases that are indicated by suffixes are shown below. These vary based on vowel harmony and the final sound of the word they are attached to.

Adjectives 
Certain adjectives may be intensified via reduplication. The involves taking the first syllable plus /p/ and adding it to the front of the word, e.g. qap-qara "very black", sap-sarɯɣ "very yellow". Other adjectives are intensified using the adverb tuŋ "very", e.g. tuŋ ulɯɣ "very big".

Numerals 
Soyot-Tsaatan employs a base-10 counting system.

Complex numerals are created much as in English, e.g. yʃ mɯŋ tos t͡ʃys tos on tos "three thousand nine hundred ninety-nine".

Ordinal numerals are formed by adding the word duɣaːr to the cardinal numeral, e.g. iˁhi duɣaːr "second".

See also 
 Dukhan Language

References 

Siberian Turkic languages
Endangered Turkic languages
Languages of Russia
Languages of Mongolia
Turkic languages